Marek Amiri (born 20 February 1987 in France) is a French footballer.

References

1987 births
Living people
Association football defenders
Athlético Marseille players
French footballers
US Marseille Endoume players